The haloacid dehydrogenase superfamily (HAD superfamily) is a superfamily of enzymes that include phosphatases, phosphonatases, P-type ATPases, beta-phosphoglucomutases, phosphomannomutases, and dehalogenases, and are involved in a variety of cellular processes ranging from amino acid biosynthesis to detoxification.

Examples 

A HAD domain is found in several distinct proteins including:

 Phospholipid-translocating ATPase , a putative lipid-flipping enzyme involved in cold tolerance in Arabidopsis 
 3-deoxy-D-manno-octulosonate (KDO) 8-phosphate phosphatase, which catalyses the final step in the biosynthesis of KDO - a component of lipopolysaccharide in Gram-negative bacteria
 Mannosyl-3-phosphoglycerate phosphatase, which hydrolyses mannosyl-3-phosphoglycerate to form the osmolyte mannosylglycerate
 Phosphoglycolate phosphatase, which catalyses the dephosphorylation of 2-phosphoglycolate
5´-Nucleotidase (EC 3.1.3.5) which either catalyzes the hydrolysis of IMP. or IMP and GMP
Hypothetical proteins

Human genes encoding proteins that contain this domain include:

 ATP8B3, ATP8B4, ATP10A, ATP10B, ATP10D

References 

Protein domains
Protein superfamilies